Adam Mahama is a Ghanaian politician and was the former member of parliament for the Damango/Daboya constituency in the Northern region of Ghana in the second parliament of the 4th republic of Ghana.

Early life and education 
He was born in Daboya, He is popularly known as Mahama Sakan, He later moved to Damongo with the Elder Brother which he began his elementary school and later went to Navrongo Secondary School and Tamale Secondary School. He has about 12 children to himself, Ishmael, Nafisha, Aisha, Nuhu, Yussif, Yussif, Hamid, Yasir, Gias, Ibrahim, Henry and Aisha. He was once Northern and Upper East Regional Agric Officer, He was the lead for Global 2000 and many other polities. He holds BSc in Soil Science from University of Ghana, Legon, Mahama holds a Master of Science degree in Management and Implementation of Development Projects from UMIST and The Victoria University of Manchester. He holds other degrees from other reputable universities across the world and not only that, he holds other important certifications such as Methods and Techniques of Project Management from and International Rural Extension which by far makes him a master in rural agricultural development. He is an agriculturist and a rural development practitioner.

Politics 
Mahama was elected to represent the Damango/Daboya constituency in the 2nd parliament of the 4th republic of Ghana in the 1996 Ghanaian general elections. He was elected on the ticket of the National Democratic Congress. He took over from Edward Aliedong Alhassan also of the National Democratic Congress who represented the constituency in the first parliament of the 4th republic of Ghana. Mahama lost his seat to Alex Seidu Sofo in the subsequent elections of 2000. Ironically Alex Seidu Sofo had lost to Adam Mahama in the election of 1996 when Mahama was elected as the member of parliament.

Elections 
Mahama was elected with 8356votes out of 17604 valid votes cast representing 47.47% of the total valid votes cast. He was elected over Alex Seidu Sofo of the People's Convention party, Abdulai Adams of the People's National Convention and Skido Alhassan Ewuntomah of the National Convention Party. These obtained 42.59%, 7.90 and 2.04 respectively of the total valid votes cast.

References 

National Democratic Congress (Ghana) politicians
Ghanaian MPs 1997–2001
21st-century Ghanaian politicians
Tamale Senior High School alumni